J'ouvert is a retail Mixtape by rapper Wyclef Jean. It was released on February 3, 2017, and features the songs "Hendrix", "If I Was President 2016", "The Ring", and "I Swear".

Composition 
Wyclef created the songs for the EP to be a preview for his upcoming album The Carnival Vol. III. Clef also announced that he wanted the EP to be released after Carnival Vol. II: Memoirs of an Immigrant, and reintroduced the character Aya Bungao. He also wanted to release the EP in early 2017, so in the summer he could release The Carnival Vol. III for the 20th anniversary of the album Wyclef Jean Presents The Carnival.

Singles 
The first single of the EP is "Hendrix", which was released on June 17, 2016. The song was accompanied by a lyric video, and then a music video. The music video also included another song on the EP, "Life Matters". The second single is "If I Was President 2016", which had a music video released right before the 2016 US election. The third single, "I Swear" featuring Young Thug, had a music video released on December 8, 2016.

"The Ring" Single was released on January 27, 2017, and a music video to accompany it was released on April 11, 2017.

"Ne me quitte pas" was released on January 27, 2017, and a music video to accompany it was released on February 2, 2017.

"Holding Onto the Edge" and "Little Things" are the last two singles of the album. Music videos are yet to be released for them.

On June 27, 2017, a music video for "Lady Haiti" was released.

Track listing

Charts

See also
J'ouvert

References 

2017 albums
Wyclef Jean albums
Albums produced by Wyclef Jean